The following is a summary of the Heilo Music albums. Heilo Music is a Norwegian record label with records published by the parent label Grappa Music.

Albums (in selection)

References

External links 
Heilo at Grappa Music Official Website

Discographies of Norwegian record labels